The flag of Goshen was the official flag of the short-lived South African territory of Goshen from 1883 to 1885. It is currently used in the Cenotaph Hall of the Voortrekker Monument.

History
The state of Goshen arose from a war in Bechuanaland in 1881–82.  It was established by a group of mercenaries who had fought in the war.  Goshen's independence was short-lived, though, as it was occupied by British forces in March 1885, and was later incorporated into British Bechuanaland. 

The executive council resolved on 5 March 1883 that the flag which they had flown during the war would be the official flag of their new state.

Description
The flag was evidently modelled on the 'vierkleur' Flag of the South African Republic, as well as the tricolor of either the German Empire or Upingtonia. The official description was :
Green against the hoist, and across from it black, white and red below each other.

References

Sources
 Burgers, A.P. (1997).  Sovereign Flags over Southern Africa.
 Burgers, A.P. (2008).  The South African Flag Book.
 Ploeger, J. (1988).  ' Die vlag en wapen van die Republiek Land Goosen' in Africana Notes & News (March 1988).

See also
 List of South African flags
 Flag of the Cape Colony
 Flag of Natal
 Flag of the Natalia Republic
 Flag of the Nieuwe Republiek
 Flag of the Orange Free State
 Flag of the Orange River Colony
 Flag of South Africa
 Flag of the South African Republic
 Flag of Stellaland
 Flag of Transvaal

1883 introductions
Flags of South Africa
South African heraldry
Historical flags